Rhydian may refer to:

 Rhydian (given name)
 Rhydian Roberts, British singer and actor
 Rhydian (album), an album by the singer
 Rhydian Vaughan, Taiwanese actor